Pirate101 is a 2012 massively multiplayer online role-playing game (MMORPG) developed and published by KingsIsle Entertainment. It is a  sister game to Wizard101, set in the same fictional universe of the “Spiral”. The player assumes the role of a pirate, who, after being rescued from a prison ship, begins searching for pieces of a map that could take them to the mythical, long-lost world of El Dorado. The player is in a race to reach it with Kane, the game’s main antagonist.

Players can complete quests, sail ships, recruit companions, and battle enemies in a turn-based combat system similar to those used in board games.

Overview
The fictional universe of the Spiral is divided into several worlds, each consisting of multiple areas. The worlds of the Spiral are islands suspended in midair within spheroid atmospheres. The first world in the game, Skull Island, is a cluster of jungle islands which serves as a pirate haven. Ships in the game sail and make port in midair. The open skies between islands are referred to as “Skyways”.

The game's content is divided into numerous "Books", which are further subdivided into individual "Chapters". Players may purchase access to all areas related to a given Chapter using "Crowns", the game's premium currency. Purchasing a membership grants unlimited access to all Chapters for a limited time. Upon character creation, players are given free access to "Introduction" and to "Prologue Part 1", the first Book.

As the player progresses, more areas become available. Currently, the maximum level a character can obtain is Level 70. 

Side activities in the Spiral include Practice PvP (player versus player), Ranked PvP, a nautical gauntlet, training pets, pet sparring, and housing.

Characters
Players can interact with, trade with, fight, and obtain quests from different NPCs located throughout the worlds of the Spiral. Companions can serve the player in combat and also provide comic relief during the story.

Pirate101 has several types of in-game characters. Two non-player characters (NPCs) in the game, Boochbeard and Mr Gandry, serve as the player's voiceover guide when the player encounters certain aspects of the game for the first time, such as being defeated in combat. They appear in the game’s prologue, with the player never physically encountering or observing them again.

The Armada is an army of humanoid clockwork pirates who invade and dominate many worlds of the Spiral. It is led by Kane, Supreme Commander of the Armada, a superintelligent humanoid clockwork whose primary goals are to reach El Dorado, make himself immortal, and then proceed to destroy the Spiral in order to recreate it in his image. 

The most senior members of the Armada besides Kane are Kane’s Court, who are among the bosses the player fights throughout the game. They are:

 Phule
 Deacon, Spymaster of the Armada
 Bishop
 Rooke, General of the Armada
 Queen

Kane, Kane’s Court, and the Armada serve as the game’s main antagonists.

Plot
The game opens with the player character, a young pirate orphan, imprisoned aboard a ship in Skull Island after rebelling against the Armada. Boochbeard and Mr Gandry rescue the player from the ship and send them to the hub of Skull Island to meet Captain Horace Avery, an extremely wealthy retired pirate who is the owner and steward of the entire Skyway. The player does quests for Avery in order to earn their keep, eventually being sent to discover pieces of a map to El Dorado, a long-lost world made entirely of gold. 

The player travels to various worlds of the Spiral—such as the imperial China-themed MooShu and the American frontier-themed Cool Ranch—in search of the map pieces. The player collects the majority of the pieces and defeats members of Kane’s Court as the game progresses.

Presently, the game’s finale is set in Valencia, an Italian Renaissance-themed world which is where Kane and the Armada originate. The world is dominated by an enormous floating machine, which Kane intends to use to destroy the Spiral. The player ultimately defeats Kane, though Queen is left alive. The game’s plot is yet to be concluded beyond this point.

Companions
Depending on the class chosen for the player's character, as well as other choices made in character creation, different companions will be assigned to the player. For example, if a player chooses the Witchdoctor class, they will fight alongside Kan Po of the MooShu Five and Mormo of the Kraken Skulls Five. If they choose "shipwrecked" as their parent's death in character creation, the player will be able to fight alongside Lucky Jack Russell of the Presidio Five. Other companions are reserved for one class only. There are currently, however, nine major companions that all players have the capacity to gain access to as they progress through the story. These companions are prominent enough to shape the plot directly, and many have their own story lines within 'promotion quests.' After the completion of these quests, involved companions often gain a new title, outfit, ability, or some combination thereof. Companions have the ability to aid the player in combat.

Payment model
The game offers a choice of either subscription or "free-to-play" with microtransactions. Free-to-play customers can purchase access to different Chapters of content using in-game currency called Crowns. Chapters only need to be purchased once, but other actions in the game may be necessary before gaining access to them. Crowns also can be used to buy in-game exclusive items and to use the Transportaler system to instantly transport to other worlds.

Players who purchase a subscription may adventure through all playable worlds and are also able to gain access to faster Energy regeneration, a larger backpack, a larger friends list, and the ability to reset companion talents. Subscribers can also post on the Pirate101 message board, and receive multiple benefits throughout the month.

Player interaction
Players may duel each other in open arenas known as the "Brawlin' Hall" and the "Spar Chamber", which allows for up to four players on two opposing teams to participate in player-versus-player combat. Most houses in the game also come with duel arenas as well, in which the number of players who can fight at once varies depending on the house.

Players can also participate in a trading system of Doubloons, which are powers that may be used once within a battle. Doubloons can be reorganized in the ability interface and may be discarded during battle in order to draw newer Doubloons. Pirates can trade equipment, housing items, mounts, or pets. A system of pet morphing is also available for players.

Loot drops are provided by chests which appear at the end of battles, the combined loot of which is distributed equally among the players who won the battle.

Online safety features
Due to its young core audience, Pirate101 restricts player interaction more than other games in the massively multiplayer online genre. Parents must activate controls for players under 13, including allowing interaction with other players in the world. There are three different types of chat: menu chat, open chat, and text chat. At the most restricted level, players select from a menu of predefined phrases, and players using this option can only see menu chat from other players. At the next level, players may type what they want, as long as the words are available in the game's dictionary. If a word is not present in the dictionary, or part of a forbidden phrase, such as asking another player's age, it will not be visible. The official game forums are filtered and moderated.

Other features have been designed with a preteen audience in mind; for example, defeated opponents in combat disintegrate or vanish bloodlessly. Character names are restricted to a preselected list from which players must choose. The game does include the use of weapons such as guns and magic; however, the guns shoot electricity rather than bullets. Also, the enemies in player versus enemy combat are not depicted as human: each world has its own type of enemy, i.e., the Bison and Birds of Cool Ranch, or the Dogs and Cats of Marleybone.

Reception

According to a KingsIsle Entertainment press release, Pirate101 had five million registered users in October 2013, matching the first year success of Wizard101. In a review of the game, Suzie Ford of MMORPG noted the game's bright aesthetics and commended its use of strategic turn-based gameplay; however, she considered the micromanagement of units overwhelming for kids, making the combat system too complicated for children. Nick Tylwalk of GameZebo said that the helpful interface makes combat very clear and is of great assistance to children. Karen Bryan of Massively said that KingsIsle Entertainment had succeeded in making a complex enough system to challenge players without over-complicating it.

Two months after the release of Pirate101, the game won the Player's Choice Award for Game of the Year from MMORPG with 27.8% of the vote, edging out Guild Wars 2 by just 0.5% of the total votes cast.

Notes

References

External links
 

2012 video games
Active massively multiplayer online games
Massively multiplayer online role-playing games
Video games developed in the United States
Windows games
Windows-only games
Video games about pirates
Gamebryo games